The Lucca Film Festival, or LFF, is an annual event that has been held in Lucca since 2005, celebrating and spreading film culture by addressing the apparent contrasts between arthouse, experimental and mainstream cinema in the broader category of the work of art. The Festival offers screenings, exhibitions, conferences, and performances, ranging from mainstream to art-house cinema.

There have been guests such as directors, actors, critics, and international artists of cinema, for instance, Kenneth Anger, Jonas Mekas, Tsai Ming-liang, Michael Snow, Paolo Taviani, Ruggero Deodato, Robert Cahen, Lou Castel, Abel Ferrara, Philippe Garrel, György Pálfi, Antoni Padrós, Benedek Fliegauf, Peter Greenaway, John Boorman, David Lynch, Oliver Stone, David Cronenberg (online),Jeremy Irons, Terry Gilliam, William Friedkin, George A. Romero, Joe Dante, Marco Bellocchio, Paolo Sorrentino, Willem Dafoe, Rutger Hauer, Philip Gröning, Michel Ocelot, Alfonso Cuarón, Olivier Assayas, Julien Temple, Rupert Everett, Martin Freeman, Matteo Garrone, Matt Dillon, Elio Germano, Valeria Golino, Laura Morante, Thomas Vinterberg, Sandra Milo, Aleksandr Sokurov, Gaspar Noé, Giuseppe Tornatore, Paolo Virzi.

History and guests 

Since its foundation (2005), the Festival has been promoting a film culture characterized by a plurality of looks, styles and perspectives: a culture that is not just a simple traditional viewing of a narrative fabric, but a sensory and intellectual experience through cinema in its most varied forms. At the beginning of 2015, a fundamental step for the expansion and consolidation of the event took place, with the association of the Lucca Film Festival with Europa Cinema, the historic Viareggio Film Festival, founded by Felice Laudadio and Federico Fellini in 1984, whose last editions had not taken place. The Municipality of Viareggio has formally requested the Lucca Film Festival to recover and restore significance to the important history and tradition of the event. As a consequence, the Festival has changed its name and became "Lucca Film Festival e Europa Cinema". Since 2015 a new programme has been created, with activities taking place each year between Lucca and Viareggio.

Over the years, the academic Artistic Direction has been able to achieve an ever-greater balance in programming, which is characterised by the successful combination of international auteur cinema and the fundamental contaminations of experimental research. The permanent sections of the Festival reflect the multidisciplinary vocation that has always distinguished the event, thanks to the involvement of illustrious international figures from the world of cinema.

The screenings and masterclasses are aimed on the one hand at paying homage to the great artists of Italian and international cinema; and on the other to contemporary cinema. The idea of organising a film festival in Lucca originated from the desire to give space and diffusion to foreign productions of an experimental nature that at the time were little known to the public. The focus on contemporary cinema is therefore reflected in a careful selection of Italian premieres that are offered to the public each year both in the section ‘in-competition’ and the ‘out-of-competition’ previews. Research is a theme that the Festival has developed thanks to various projects, some of which have also enabled the rediscovery and correct historicization of artists and pioneers of experimental cinema.

The Festival, particularly since 2016, has begun to build collaborations with many of the most important Italian and international distribution entities.

During the Festival, participants are honoured with screenings, masterclasses, exhibitions, concerts and, for some of them, with the awarding of the Festival’s ‘Lifetime Achievement Award’. All artists, in addition to participating in one or more evenings, hold at least one press conference and one masterclass. The Lifetime Achievement Award, conceived in 2014, is a recognition given to the so-called 'Masters'; in other words, to all those artists (directors and/or actors) invited to the Lucca Film Festival who have distinguished themselves for their masterful skills during their career. Each Award is presented during a special gala evening held at the Cinema Astra in Lucca. The Festival's red carpet is also set up, linking the cinema to the Teatro del Giglio and the Hotel Grand Universe.

The Festival has always organised at least three exhibitions that connect cinema and art. The exhibition sector sees the collaboration with contemporary artists and with the realities dedicated to art within the national territory. In particular with the Carlo Ludovico Ragghianti Foundation, with which every year the Festival creates a series of co-produced exhibitions.

The ‘Cinema Arte&Musica’ section is concerned with presenting a selection of films and documentaries that deal with the dialogue between cinema & art, and cinema & music, with particular attention to selecting products related to the contents of the event’s showcasing sequence and structure.

The ‘Effetto Cinema Notte’ section encompasses all performance events and presents a special evening each year involving dozens of theatre and dance companies. Each of which, produces a homage performance to a film in conjunction with a public venue in the historic centre. The section was founded in 2013 from a collaboration between the Lucca Film Festival and Lucca Effetto Cinema. The project of the Fondazione Banca del Monte in Lucca that supports and promotes film activity in the territory, takes care of the organization and realization of the event entitled Effetto Cinema Notte. It is a festival involving public establishments in the historic centre as a tribute to many films in an unusual format that has been able to grow year after year as a trait of union between the Festival's cultural policies and the economic and social fabric of the city of Lucca. It has also seen the establishment of a partnership with Confcommercio of Lucca and Massa Carrara. Each year, the shops decorate their interiors, each inspired by a great film from the history of cinema. During the evening of the festival, performances by actors and dancers are staged inside and outside the premises, paying homage to the chosen subject, in collaboration with ACSI and FITA. The film in question is also shown inside the premises throughout the week of the Festival.

The primary objective of the Festival is to act as a school of thought, method, and ideas for the growth of the new generations; the Festival has always focused its attention on the world of schools, universities, and film academies, encouraging the participation of young people in the activities of the educational section and offering internships. Since 2018, the Festival has also been running courses dedicated to the training of high school teachers in order to encourage the integration of cinema in school curricula.

The collaborations with other festivals and events have grown throughout the years and have made it possible for this event to expand its artistic and cultural offering.

Among the synergic collaborations that must be mentioned, we can find the one with ‘Over The Real’, the International Videoart Festival, co-produced with and part of the Lucca Film Festival programme, which every year presents the most significant lines of research that have emerged in the international panorama of audio-visual arts and intermedia performances, proposing about eighty works by artists from all over the world as Italian premieres.

An element of strong internationalisation was represented by the Festival's entrance into the international "Film for our Future Network" in 2018 (www.quindici19.com/film-for-our-future), composed of ten European festivals, dedicated to disseminating and promoting the themes of the 17 goals contained in the UN 2030 programme. Each year, the Festival holds screenings and meetings dealing with these issues and actively participates in the activities implemented by other members of the network throughout the year.

The cities of Lucca and Viareggio are brought to life with a multiplicity of prestigious authors, artists and professionals who can speak with the public through meetings, debates, exhibitions, and screenings.

Editions 

2005 Edition
2006 Edition
2007 Edition
2008 Edition
2009 Edition
2010 Edition
2011 Edition
2012 Edition
2013 Edition
2014 Edition
2015 Edition
2016 Edition
2017 Edition
2018 Edition
2019 Edition
2020 Edition
2021 Edition

Short-film competition 

Iconic section of Lucca Film Festival since its first edition in 2005. The selection claims tens of short films coming from all over the world and selected at the most important cinema festivals. The works presented in the short film competition are judged by three juries: one jury of international experts in audiovisual, one popular jury and one university jury.

Feature film competition 
Founded in 2016, the Competition selects Italian premiere films from all over the world with an extraordinary multiplicity of genres, languages and contents. The festival hosted the works of some of the most talented young authors of independent cinema with works that come directly from the most interesting international festivals, such as Sundance, Locarno, Berlin, Slamdance and Rotterdam. Over the years the competition has boasted the presence in the jury of important personalities from the world of cinema such as: Rutger Hauer, Philip Gröning, Cristi Puiu, Claudio Giovannesi, Daniele Ciprì, Massimo Gaudioso, Massimo Cantini Parrini. The works presented in the feature film competition are judged by three juries: a jury of international audiovisual professionals, a popular jury and a third university jury.

Festival venues 
Projections and meetings
 Teatro-Auditorium San Girolamo - Lucca
Vincenzo da Massa Carrara Auditorium
Fondazione Banca del Monte Auditorium
Cinema Centrale - Lucca
Cinema Astra - Lucca
Cinema Moderno - Lucca
Cinema Centrale - Viareggio
Cinema Eden - Viareggio
Teatro del Giglio
Exhibitions
 Fondazione Carlo Ludovico Ragghianti - Complesso di S. Micheletto 
 Ex Convento di San Francesco - Piazza San Francesco
 Archivio di Stato di Lucca
Lu.CCA - Lucca Center of Contemporary Art
Centro Culturale Agorà  - Piazza dei Servi
Galleria Olio su Tavola
GAMC

References

External links

Related items 

 Lucca film festival retrospectives

Lucca
Film festivals in Italy